Paweł Kaczmarek (born 8 September 1995) is a Polish sprint kayaker. He competed in the K-1 200 m event at the 2016 Summer Olympics, but failed to reach the final. In 2015 he was named Athlete of the Year of the Lubusz Voivodeship.

References

External links
 
 

1995 births
Living people
Canoeists at the 2016 Summer Olympics
Olympic canoeists of Poland
Polish male canoeists
People from Człuchów
European Games competitors for Poland
Canoeists at the 2015 European Games
Canoeists at the 2019 European Games
21st-century Polish people